I Need Romance 2012 is a 2012 South Korean romantic comedy television drama, starring Jung Yu-mi, Lee Jin-wook and Kim Ji-seok. The series follows the everyday lives of work, love and friendship of thirty-something women and men in Seoul. It aired on cable channel tvN from June 20 to August 9, 2012 on Wednesdays and Thursdays at 23:00 for 16 episodes.

Following the success of tvN's I Need Romance in 2011, I Need Romance 2012 is a loose spin-off with new characters, but continues the first season's frank discussion of sex and realistic depiction of messy relationships.

Plot
Joo Yeol-mae was in a 12 year on-and-off relationship with her boyfriend Yoon Seok-hyun, before they broke up for the fifth time 3 years ago. This is mainly because Seok-hyun keeps her at arm's length and does not want to get married. However, even after they break up, Yeol-mae and Seok-hyun remain friends and are present in each other's lives. Enter Shin Ji-hoon, an alluring new love interest who shakes up Yeol-mae's world and lands her in a love triangle. Torn between two men, can Yeol-mae find true romance, or will she lose it all?

Cast
Jung Yu-mi as Joo Yeol-mae 
Lee Jin-wook as Yoon Seok-hyun 
Kim Ji-seok as Shin Ji-hoon 
Kim Ji-woo as Seon Jae-kyung 
Kang Ye-sol as Woo Ji-hee 
Kim Ye-won as Kang Na-hyun 
In Gyo-jin as Han Jung-min
Gong Jung-hwan as Lee Jang-woo
Heo Tae-hee as Kim Tae-woo 
Jung Gyu-woon as blind date Kim Han-sub (cameo)
Yoon Sung-ho as trench coat man (cameo)
Choi Song-hyun as Kang Hyun-joo (cameo)
Ha Yeon-joo as Yoon Kang-hee (cameo)
Kim Hyung-min as Kim Deok-soo (cameo)
Kim Sae-ron as Yoon Gi-hyun (cameo)

Awards and nominations

References

External links
 

2012 South Korean television series debuts
2012 South Korean television series endings
Korean-language television shows
TVN (South Korean TV channel) television dramas
South Korean romance television series
South Korean comedy television series
Television series by JS Pictures